Targoviste  means "marketplace" and may refer to:
 Targovishte, a city in Bulgaria
 Târgoviște, a city in Romania
 Târgoviște, a village in Balinț commune, Timiș County, Romania

See also
 
 Trgovište (disambiguation)